Eric Fairweather Harrison (16 April 1880 – 15 April 1948) was an Australian soldier and politician.

Harrison was born the son of English-born James Start Harrison in the Sydney suburb of Stanmore, New South Wales and educated at Sydney Church of England Grammar School and Bedford School in England.  He graduated from Trinity College, Cambridge with a B.A. in 1901 and a M.A. in 1902. He was part of a Trinity crew which won the Thames Cup at Henley Royal Regatta.

He returned to Australia in 1903 and joined the militia garrison artillery in New South Wales.  In April 1904, he was commissioned as a lieutenant in the Royal Australian Artillery.  In 1910, he was the first Australian to attend the Staff College at Quetta, now in Pakistan.

Harrison was promoted to major in 1914 and at the commencement of World War I was the duty staff officer at Army Headquarters and gave the instruction to fire across the bows of the SS Pfalz, the first shots fired by the British Empire during the war.  He was subsequently appointed director of military training at army headquarters and from October 1915, director of military art at the Royal Military College, Duntroon (R.M.C.).  In October 1917 he joined the First Australian Imperial Force as a major and served in France at Hazebrouck, Strazeele, Flêtre and on the Somme.  In September 1918 he took part in the Battle of the Hindenburg Line. He was made brevet lieutenant-colonel in January 1919 and mentioned in dispatches in March.

Harrison married Roma Wingfield Zilla Clarke in November 1920.  He was appointed commandant of the R.M.C. in January 1929 and promoted colonel in July.  He retired from the army in January 1931 and took up farming on the Mornington Peninsula.

He won the seat of Bendigo for the United Australia Party in the 1931 election.  He 1937 he failed to get party pre-selection for the new seat of Deakin.

In August 1940, Harrison  was recalled from the reserve and reappointed as commandant of the R.M.C. until his retirement in January 1942.  He died in Melbourne, survived by his wife, a son and a daughter.  His son, Brian was the member for Maldon in the British House of Commons from 1955 to 1974.

Notes

Australian brigadiers
Australian military personnel of World War I
Australian Army personnel of World War II
Military personnel from New South Wales
Graduates of the Staff College, Quetta
United Australia Party members of the Parliament of Australia
Members of the Australian House of Representatives for Bendigo
1880 births
1948 deaths
People educated at Bedford School
Alumni of Trinity College, Cambridge
20th-century Australian politicians